Cranefree is the trademark for offshore foundations marketed by the company Seatower.  This technology is focused on the offshore wind sector, and is designed to avoid using heavy-lift crane vessels in order to make offshore construction less risky and costly.  Furthermore, the design avoids seabed preparation (dredging and piling) in most cases.

References

Engineering companies of Norway
Offshore engineering